The United Synagogue of Conservative Judaism (USCJ) is the major congregational organization of Conservative Judaism in North America, and the largest Conservative Jewish communal body in the world. USCJ closely works with the Rabbinical Assembly, the international body of Conservative rabbis. It coordinates and assists the activities of its member communities on all levels.

History 
Representatives of twenty-two Jewish congregations in North America met at the Jewish Theological Seminary on 23 February 1913. The representatives formed the United Synagogue of America to develop and perpetuate Conservative Judaism. The group elected Rabbi Dr. Solomon Schechter the first president.

At its executive council's April 1913 meeting, the organization's purpose was defined as loyalty to the Torah; to promote observance of Shabbat and Jewish dietary laws; to preserve Israel's past and promote its restoration; to maintain traditional Jewish prayer in Hebrew; to promote traditional Judaism in the home; and to encourage the establishment of Jewish religious schools whose instruction includes the study of the Hebrew language and its literature as a bond that unites Jewish people worldwide.

The name of the organization was changed to the United Synagogue of Conservative Judaism in 1991.

Role and description

United Synagogue of Conservative Judaism has 572 affiliated congregations .

Programs
USCJ sponsors the following programs:

 United Synagogue Youth (USY) is the youth movement of USCJ. The organization's mission is to empower Jewish youth to develop friendships, leadership skills, a sense of belonging to the Jewish People, a deep engagement with and love for Israel, and a commitment to inspired Jewish living through meaningful and fun experiences based on the ideology of Conservative Judaism.
 Nativ is USCJ's academic gap year program in Israel for in-bound college freshmen.
 The Conservative Yeshiva in Jerusalem is USCJ's learning community in Israel.

See also
 Masorti on Campus
 United Synagogue Youth
 Fuchsberg Center

References

External links
 
 Guide to the United Synagogue of Conservative Judaism Soviet Jewry Collection at the American Jewish Historical Society, New York.

 
 
 
Jewish organizations established in 1913
1913 establishments in New York (state)